The 1949 IFA Shield Final was the 56th final of the IFA Shield, the second oldest football competition in India, and was contested between Kolkata giants East Bengal and Mohun Bagan on 15 September 1949 at the Calcutta Ground in Kolkata.

East Bengal won the final 2–0 to claim their 3rd IFA Shield title. Pansanttom Venkatesh and Ahmed Khan scored the two goals as East Bengal lifted their third IFA Shield title.

Route to the final

Match

Summary
The IFA Shield final began at the Calcutta Ground in Kolkata on 15 September 1949 in front of a packed crowd as Kolkata giants East Bengal and Mohun Bagan faced each other in a Kolkata Derby. East Bengal reached their sixth final, having won twice in 1943 and 1945, after defeating Maharana Club 8–0 in the semi-final. Mohun Bagan, the two-time defending champions, made their fourth consecutive appearance in the final after they defeated New Delhi Heroes 4–1 in the semi-final.

Mohun Bagan was the first to attack in the very first minute as Runu Guha Thakurta passed to Selim and the latter set Rashid on move with a backpass but Taj Mohammed intercepted the attack near the East Bengal goal. Selim got another chance immediately after but he shot wide after being played through by Nayar. East Bengal slowly got back into the game and made their first attack in the seventh minute as P. B. A. Saleh shot over the bar after receiving a pass from Pansanttom Venkatesh. East Bengal opened the scoring in the fourteenth minute after Apparao provided a forward pass to Venkatesh, who sped away from two defenders and beat Mohun Bagan custodian D. Sen with a left-footed shot to make it 1–0. In the twenty-third minute, East Bengal doubled the lead, after Saleh rolled the ball to Ahmed Khan who sent an angular shot into the net through a number of legs to make it 2–0. In the second half, Mohun Bagan made several attempts to get back into the game but Manilal Ghatak managed to keep a clean sheet as East Bengal emerged victorious and lifted their third IFA Shield title, also managing to win the coveted Double of winning both the League and Shield for the second time in their history, after 1945.

Details

References

External links
IFA Shield Finals

IFA Shield finals
1949–50 in Indian football
East Bengal Club matches
Mohun Bagan AC matches
Football competitions in Kolkata